Indian Institute of Technology, Hyderabad (abbreviated IIT Hyderabad or IITH) is a public technical research university located in Sangareddy district in the Indian state of Telangana. As with all Indian Institutes of Technology (IITs), IIT Hyderabad is an Institute of National Importance.

IITH was founded in 2008, among the eight young Indian Institutes of Technology. It has a total of 3,903 students (1,553 Undergraduate, 1,221 Masters and 1,129 PhD students) with 255 full-time faculty members as of 15 Jan 2022.

History

IIT Hyderabad was established by the Ministry of Education, Government of India under the Institutes of Technology (Amendment) Act, 2011. The Act was passed in the Lok Sabha on 24 March 2011 and by the Rajya Sabha on 30 April 2012. It was set up in technical and financial assistance from Government of Japan.

IIT Hyderabad began functioning on 18 August 2008 from a temporary campus in Armoured Vehicles Nigam Limited, with Prof. U. B. Desai as the founding director.  In July 2015, it moved to its 576-acre permanent campus at Kandi, Sangareddy. At present, Prof B S Murty is the Director of IIT Hyderabad. It is close to the outer ring road and located on NH-65.

Campus
The IITH campus is on a land area of 576 acres (234 ha). The academic building is designed by New Delhi-based ARCOP and hostel by Pune-based acclaimed American architect, Prof. Christopher Charles Benninger. This organic campus is divided into clusters of buildings being completed in phases starting in 2011. The campus is one of India's best examples of energy efficient, carbon neutral and sustainable architecture. The design grew out of local weather conditions and utmost care to enhance learning. The graduate and post-graduate programs are separated, student and teacher housing is divided, and girls and boys hostels are segregated for a pluralistic environment.

The 25 lakh square feet of buildings in Phase 1A; 3 academic blocks and 10 functioning hostel buildings (each with a capacity of 200) were completed in March 2019.

Hostels

Hostels
Dorm rooms at IIT Hyderabad are traditional one-person rooms. Most students reside in the ten hostel buildings on-campus. Two out of the ten hostel buildings accommodate female students exclusively. Dining facilities are located in centralized halls. Students are assigned specific rooms at the time of admission where they will live, usually for the remainder of their stay at the institute. Students are provided with complimentary high-speed fiber optic internet for academic and personal purposes.

IIT Hyderabad Research Park

In 2018, Government of India sanctioned Research Park to some IITs in which IIT Hyderabad got its place. IIT Hyderabad Research Park is a self-reliant team endorsed by IIT Hyderabad and its alumni. The IIT Hyderabad Research Park promotes the betterment of research and development by the institute through friendship with industry, helping in the advancement of modern ventures, and build-up economic development. The IIT Hyderabad Research Park assists organizations with a research target to set up an infrastructure in the park and advantage the expertise available at IIT Hyderabad.

IIT Hyderabad Technology Research Park (TRP) with a total Built-up area is 19,560 square meters was recently (On 4 February 2022) inaugurated by Srivari Chandrasekhar, secretary, Department of Science & Technology, Government of India (GoI).

Organisation and administration

Governance

All IITs follow the same organization structure which has President of India as visitor at the top of the hierarchy. Directly under the President is the IIT Council. Under the IIT Council is the board of governors of each IIT. Under the board of governors is the director, who is the chief academic and executive officer of the IIT. Under the director, in the organizational structure, comes the deputy director. Under the director and the deputy director, come the deans, heads of departments, registrar.

Departments
IIT Hyderabad has 18 departments:

Engineering 
 Artificial intelligence
 Biomedical engineering
 Biotechnology and Bioinformatics
 Chemical engineering
 Climate change
 Civil engineering
 Computer Science and Engineering
 Electrical Engineering
 Engineering Science
 Heritage Science and Technology
 Materials Science and Metallurgical Engineering
 Mechanical and Aerospace Engineering

Science 
 Mathematics
 Physics
 Chemistry

Liberal Arts, Design, and Management 
 Liberal Arts
 Design
 Entrepreneurship and Management

Research and industrial consultancy
IIT Hyderabad has 110 laboratories on the campus, of which 50 are exclusively for research. Over 80% of the faculty has either one sponsored research project or a consulting project. There is an emphasis on innovation, with more than 7,246 research publications and patent disclosures, 1,668 sponsored/consultancy projects, and industry collaborations.

IIT Hyderabad is involved in the DISANET project for disaster mitigation, an Indo-Japanese collaboration.

IIT Hyderabad has also been involved with India's first 5G patent removing fluoride from water using naturally occurring Jamun seeds, developing a constant drug delivery system for the body through skin patch and other research projects.

Inter-disciplinary centres
 Design Innovation Centre
 Centre for Cyber Physical Systems and IoT
 Teaching Learning Centre (TLC)
 Tinkerer's Laboratory – variety of scientific instruments including scientific instruments, electronic components, 3D printers, CNCs, workstations etc.

Incubation centers

 iTIC Incubator at IIT Hyderabad
 Center for Healthcare Entrepreneurship
 Fabless Chip Design Incubator

Academics

IIT Hyderabad offers BTech and MTech degrees in ten disciplines of Engineering, B Des and M Des degree in design and MSc degrees in science. In 2019, the institute started offering M. A. in Development Studies. The institute also offers PhD across all disciplines of engineering, sciences and liberal arts. At the institute, every semester, undergraduate students have the option to take courses in liberal arts and creative arts such macroeconomics, introductory psychology, introduction to the Japanese, French, or German language, introduction to carnatic or western classical music, theater, pottery and ceramics and Madhubani painting. It uses a Fractal Academic System, involving continuous evaluation of students, and more choices on subject they want to pursue outside their core area.

Admission
Admission to BTech programs is through the Joint Entrance Examination – Advanced for 285 seats. Among all the IITs, IIT Kanpur and IIT Hyderabad had all their seats taken between 2013 and 2017.

Admission to the B.Des program is through the Undergraduate Common Entrance Examination for Design (UCEED). The B.Des program started at IIT Hyderabad from August 2019. with 10 seats. All qualified candidates with a valid Common Entrance Examination for Design (CEED) score become eligible to apply for M.Des admission.

Admission to MTech programs requires BTech/B.E. degree or equivalent in the respective or allied areas and possessing a Graduate Aptitude Test in Engineering (GATE) score. Admission to the MSc program requires BSc or an equivalent degree with 65% for GE/OBC, 60% for SC/ST or equivalent in the respective or allied areas and possessing a valid Joint Admission Test to MSc (JAM) score. Admission to the M. A. Development Studies program also requires an undergraduate degree and candidates must clear the entrance exam conducted by the institute.

Admission to PhD Program requires either BTech/GATE qualification for engineering departments with a good academic background or MTech/GATE qualification for engineering departments or National Eligibility Test (NET) qualification for Science departments.

Rankings

IIT Hyderabad was ranked 591–600 in the world by the QS World University Rankings 2022 list; it was also ranked 201 in Asia in 2020.

In India, IIT Hyderabad was ranked 8 among engineering institutes by the National Institutional Ranking Framework in 2021 and 16 overall. IIT Hyderabad is also ranked Top-7 institute as per ARIIA 2021 released by the Ministry of Education, Innovation Cell.

Student life

Elan & ηVision 
Elan & ηVision, is the heart of the college. It is the annual techno-cultural fest of IIT Hyderabad, and the largest college fest in South India. The first edition of this cultural grandeur (Elan) started in 2009. The fest takes place in the beginning of the year, in either January or February. IIT Hyderabad also hosted ηVision, an annual inter-institute technical festival, since 2011. Since 2016, both events have been merged into a single annual fest called Elan & ηVision. The fest attracts a footfall of around 15K spread across 400+ colleges and hosting 60+ events.
The pronites are the star attractions of Elan & ηVision, drawing thousands of footfall. The previous editions of the fest have seen shows by Shirley Setia, Benny Dayal, Nikhil Chinapa, Gajendra Verma, Kailash Kher, Darshan Raval, Rave Radio, Divine (rapper), Zakir Khan (comedian), and numerous other artists. Each year the fest also promotes a social cause to bring awareness and bring about reforms. The 9th edition was graced by Vijay Deverakonda, the popular cinema actor, as he promoted social cause campaign of an eco-friendly world. The fest has also seen Ira Trivedi, Amala Akkineni, S. P. Balasubrahmanyam, and many more for various talk shows. Elan & ηVision is a platform to showcase talents across multiple spectrums, with several events like Cryptex, FMI, Manthan, Elan-e-Jung, Breakfree, Quizzes, Robo Soccer, Enigma, Battlebots, etc.

See also
International Institute of Information Technology, Hyderabad
List of universities in India
List of institutions of higher education in India
Education in India
University Grants Commission (India)
Ministry of Education (India)
List of institutions of higher education in Telangana

References

External links
 IIT Hyderabad Announcement in AP Assembly
 IIT Hyderabad official Website 

Hyderabad
Engineering colleges in Hyderabad, India
2008 establishments in Andhra Pradesh
Educational institutions established in 2008